The Stuttgart Open, also known by its sponsored name Porsche Tennis Grand Prix, is a women's tennis tournament held in Stuttgart, Germany (until 2005, in Filderstadt, a southern suburb of Stuttgart). Held since 1978, the tournament is the oldest women's indoor tournament in Europe. The event was part of the Tier II category from 1990 until 2008 and as of 2009 has been a Premier tournament on the WTA Tour. The singles champion receives prize money and a Porsche sports car. Until 2008 the tournament was played on hardcourt in autumn. Since 2009 it is played on clay court in spring, as a warm-up tournament to the French Open, making it the first indoor clay court event on the women's tour.

The players voted for the Porsche Tennis Grand Prix as their favourite Premier tournament in 2007, 2008, 2010–2012, 2014–2017.

The tournament has been won by many former number ones and Grand Slam champions. Martina Navratilova holds the record for most singles wins at the event, with six titles between 1982 and 1992, in addition to eight doubles titles. Tracy Austin and Martina Hingis both come second with four wins each in the singles event, with Austin winning four consecutive. This is followed by Lindsay Davenport and Maria Sharapova with three wins each.

Iga Świątek is the current champion.

History
The tournament was founded by businessman Dieter Fischer who had organized a men's exhibition tournament in Filderstadt in 1977 to open his tennis centre. After failing to schedule a men's event in 1978 a license for a Tier II women's tournament was purchased for $100,000 and the first edition was held in October 1978, won by 15-year old Tracy Austin. In March 1979 a men's tournament was held, won by Wojciech Fibak, but this event was discontinued as it required too much effort to organize two tournaments annually with a volunteer force. In 1992 a request for promotion to the Tier I category was rejected by the WTA on the grounds that the tournament's centre court, with a 3,000-seat capacity, was too small. In 2002 Fischer sold the tournament licence to Porsche who had been the official sponsor since the first edition.

Past finals

Singles

Doubles

See also 
 Stuttgart Open – men's tournament
 List of tennis tournaments

Notes

References

External links

Official site

 
Tennis tournaments in Germany
Indoor tennis tournaments
Hard court tennis tournaments
Clay court tennis tournaments
WTA Tour
Recurring sporting events established in 1978